Tímea, Timea or originally, Timéa is a popular Hungarian female given name.

The name Tímea was created by the popular Hungarian author Mór Jókai for a figure in his 1872 novel The Man with the Golden Touch.  It is derived from Euthymia, a Greek noun meaning "sweet natured".

People with the name 
 Tímea Babos (born 1993), Hungarian tennis player
 Timea Bacsinszky (born 1989), Swiss tennis player
 Tímea Gál (born 1984), Hungarian football player
 Tímea Kiss (born 1973), Hungarian archer
 Tímea Lőrincz (born 1992), Romanian cross-country skier
 Timea Majorová (born 1974), Slovak fitness competitor
 Tímea Nagy (born 1970), Hungarian fencer
 Tímea Nagy (activist) (born 1977), Hungarian trafficked worker in Canada
 Tímea Paksy (born 1983), Hungarian sprint canoer
 Tímea Papp (born 1973), Hungarian dancer
 Tímea Sugár (born 1977), Hungarian handball coach
 Tímea Szabó (born 1976), Hungarian humanitarian worker, journalist and politician
 Tímea Szögi (born 1990), Hungarian handball player
 Timea Tătar (born 1989), Romanian handball player
 Tímea Tóth (born 1980), Hungarian former handballer
 Timea Toth (swimmer) (1968), Israeli Olympic swimmer

References

Hungarian feminine given names